Environmental issues in Wales refers to the various issues facing Wales, including climate change, pollution and ecosystem loss, and the various policies to address them.

Carbon emissions

Sources 

 Energy supply is the largest source
 14% agriculture, including the contribution of 8.9 million sheep and 414,000 cows
 Cars alone are responsible for 60% of the transport emission. A move to hybrid and electric may reduce emissions.
 Iron and steel industries in Wales contribute 60% of business emissions

Trends 
Emissions are reducing in Wales. After 2016, shutting the last coal-fired power station in Wales contributed "toward half" of the fall in emissions in 2016. Over the last 30 years, there has been a 31% cut in emissions. The goal for 2030 is to have reached a 63% reduction, and by 2050 to reach net-zero carbon emission. These aims are a significant challenge.

Welsh Government Targets 
2021–2025: average 37% reduction

2026–2030: average 58% reduction

2030: 63% reduction

2040: 89%

2050: at least net zero

Climate change 

Climate change is a factor during the assessment for future developments in Wales since December 2021. Wales is the first country in the UK where developers must consider future flood risk due or coastal erosion due to global warming. 11.3% of land in Wales will be at risk from flooding in the future, up from 9.86% as previously projected.

Recycling capabilities 

Wales' recycling rate was 4.8% in 1998–1999 but has now risen to 65.4% in 2021, ranking Wales as the third-best recycling country in the world, behind only Germany and Taiwan. the Welsh Government states that this has been helped by a £1 billion investment since the establishment of the Senedd in 1999. The high rate of recycling household waste in Wales is said to avoid the release of 400,000 tonnes of CO2 into the atmosphere each year and is a "key" contribution to reducing climate change.

The Welsh Government’s circular economy plans states a plan to achieve zero waste in Wales by 2050.

Air PollutionAnalysis of Imperial College London data by the Central Office of Public Interest (COPI), a campaign group, found that 93% of people in Wales lived in postcodes that were exposed to air that breached at least one WHO limit for toxic pollutants.

Legal 
The Environment (Wales) Act 2016 required the Welsh Government to set reduced emission targets by the end of 2018.

Sustainable developments 
The Centre for Alternative Technology (CAT) is an eco-centre in Powys, mid-Wales, dedicated to demonstrating and teaching sustainable development. CAT, despite its name, no longer concentrates its efforts exclusively on alternative technology, but provides information on all aspects of sustainable living.

See also

 Environment Wales
 Renewable energy in Wales
 Wales Green Party

References 

Environmental issues in Wales